is a private university in Sakado, Saitama, Japan, established in 1965. The predecessor of the school, Jōsai Gakuen Middle School, later Jōsai High School, was founded in 1918. The university is operated by the Josai University Educational Corporation, which was founded by the 17th Minister of Finance, Mikio Mizuta (1905 – 1976). Mizuta was Minister of Finance from 1960 to 1962, and then served as the first chancellor of Josai. The university opened with a Faculty of Economics and Faculty of Science. The Mizuta Museum of Art opened in 1976, and the graduate school of Josai University was established in 1977. The Josai University Educational Corporation also operates Josai International University, founded in 1992.

Exchange programs
Josai University maintains exchange programs with the following five institutions.
Camosun College, Victoria, British Columbia, Canada
Tamkang University, Tamsui, New Taipei, Taiwan
Dongseo University, Busan, South Korea
Universiti Tunku Abdul Rahman, Perak, Malaysia
Management and Science University, Selangor, Malaysia

Notable alumni
Yuki Takamiya, long-distance runner

References

External links
 

1965 establishments in Japan
Educational institutions established in 1965
Private universities and colleges in Japan
Universities and colleges in Saitama Prefecture
Sakado, Saitama